is a Japanese fencer. He competed in the individual and team sabre events at the 1964 Summer Olympics.

References

External links
 

1937 births
Living people
Japanese male sabre fencers
Olympic fencers of Japan
Fencers at the 1964 Summer Olympics